Seán McCormack (born 1940) is an Irish former Gaelic footballer who played at club level with Kilmainhamwood and at inter-county level with the Meath senior football team. He usually lined out as a goalkeeper.

Honours

Kilmainhamwood
Meath Intermediate Football Championship: 1965

Meath
All-Ireland Senior Football Championship: 1967
Leinster Senior Football Championship: 1966, 1967, 1970
All-Ireland Junior Football Championship: 1962
Leinster Junior Football Championship: 1962

References

1942 births
Living people
Kilmainhamwood Gaelic footballers
Meath inter-county Gaelic footballers
Winners of one All-Ireland medal (Gaelic football)
Gaelic football goalkeepers